The British Humane Association is a British charitable association, established in 1920 by Louis Campbell-Johnston (1861-1929). Its headquarters are in 4 Charterhouse Mews in Clerkenwell, London and it has been directed by Ben Campbell-Johnston since May 1988. The association provides the British Humane Association Grant which is geared toward providing relief of inhumane activities, relief of sickness or poverty and providing benefits to local communities.

References

Charities based in London
1920 establishments in England
Social welfare charities based in the United Kingdom
Organizations established in 1920
1920 establishments in the United Kingdom